Smyrna Township is one of ten townships in Jefferson County, Indiana, United States. As of the 2010 census, its population was 1,096 and it contained 466 housing units.

Created on June 16, 1847 by the Jefferson County Commissioners, Smyrna was the last of Jefferson County's 10 townships to be formed. It is largely rural with only small unincorporated areas as population centers.

No post offices operate in the township.

The following post offices once operated in the township: Creswell (May 29, 1856-Nov. 30, 1892) and (June 6, 1893-Sept. 13, 1902); Volga (May 29, 1856 – July 14, 1904); Wakefield (July 8, 1899-Feb. 15, 1905). 6.

Geography
The streams of Goose Creek, Harberts Creek and Hensley Creek run through this township.

Unincorporated towns
 Midway
 Neavill Grove
 Smyrna
 Volga
 Wakefield

Adjacent townships
 Lancaster Township (north)
 Monroe Township (northeast)
 Madison Township (east)
 Republican Township (southwest)
 Graham Township (west)

Cemeteries
The township contains the following cemeteries: Brown (Sauer farm) Ford, Hopewell, Kinnear, Lawler (1) and Lawler (2), Lowe, McKay-Stites, Neavill, Shiloh, and Smyrna Presbyterian.

Major highways
  Indiana State Road 7

References
 U.S. Board on Geographic Names (GNIS)
 United States Census Bureau cartographic boundary files

Baker, J. David, The Postal History of Indiana, 1976, Philatelic Bibliophile, P.O. Box 213971, Louisville, Ky. 1976.

Gresham, John M. & Co., 1889. Biographical & Historical Souvenir for the Counties of Clark, Crawford, Harrison, Floyd, Jefferson, Jennings, Scott and Washington.

John Paul Chapter DAR. Jefferson County Cemetery Transcriptions, 1941

External links
 Indiana Township Association
 United Township Association of Indiana

Townships in Jefferson County, Indiana
Townships in Indiana